Compton Wynyates is a Tudor country house in Warwickshire, England, a Grade I listed building. The Tudor period house is constructed of red brick and built around a central courtyard.  It is castellated and turreted in parts.  Following action in the Civil War, half timbered gables were added to replace damaged parts of the building.  Today, set in its topiary gardens and green lawns,  its appearance of idealized English country life contrasts sharply with the story of the family that has lived there for over five hundred years, a story inextricably linked to the history of the house as both have prospered, declined and prospered simultaneously.

The Compton family, who still live today in this private house, appear in records as resident on the site as early as 1204.  The family continued to live in the manor house as knights and squires of the county until Sir Edmund Compton (who died c. 1493) decided, c. 1481, to build a new family home.

Edmund Compton's house 
Edmund Compton constructed the house of bricks which have a glowing raspberry colour of striking intensity. Edmund's four-winged house around a central courtyard is recognisable by the thickness of the 4 ft deep walls which form the core of the existing mansion.   This new fortified house was fully moated, and parts of the moat form a pond in the garden today.  There was also a second moat (probably dry) and second drawbridge.  However, fortifications were not the only consideration for the new mansion—dark brick diapering and decorative mouldings add variety to the façade.  Over the entrance the Royal Arms of England are supported by the dragon and greyhound of Henry VII and Henry VIII. The architect or mason builder is unknown.

William Compton's house 

Edmund died young and, as a consequence, his son William Compton became a ward of the Crown, as was the custom.  At the court of Henry VII the eleven-year-old, orphaned William Compton became a page to the two-year-old Prince Henry, thus began a close friendship which continued after the prince succeeded as Henry VIII.  As a result of this lifelong friendship, Henry VIII gave William, who was also to become a military hero, many rewards, amongst them the ruinous Fulbroke Castle.  Numerous fittings at Fulbroke were brought to embellish Compton Wynyates, including the huge bay window full of heraldic glass, which looks into the courtyard from the great hall; also from the castle came many of the mullioned windows with vine-patterned ornamentation.

It was at this time (c. 1515) that the great entrance porch, chapel and many of the towers were built.  In fact, this was the start of the many additions over the next ten years which were added to the house with no thought of symmetry, height or regularity.  The house was simply  extended wherever space within the confines of the moat permitted.  The brick-fluted and twisted chimneys also date from this time and are one of the house's most notable features.

Unlike many other houses of the period, Compton Wynyates has not been greatly altered over the centuries. This is because in 1574 its owner Henry Compton, 1st Baron Compton, began work on one of Britain's finest houses, Castle Ashby. The Comptons continued to lavish money on this new mansion for the next century or so; as a consequence, Compton Wynyates has survived almost intact as the perfect Tudor mansion, spared the constant improvements of successive generations.

Royal visits 
The Comptons, as loyal and rich subjects of the Crown, frequently played host to the reigning sovereign of their time.  The frequency with which they entertained state visitors was a barometer of their wealth, and this was an era in which a one-day visit from the monarch could, and frequently did, bankrupt the host.

King Henry VIII stayed many times at Compton Wynyates, and his bedroom window still retains the king's arms in stained glass combined with the arms of Aragon, the home country of his first Queen. Much later, in 1572, Elizabeth I stayed in the house. In 1617  James I spent a night at the house; he had been a frequent guest on previous occasions at Castle Ashby.  In 1629 King Charles I, who himself stayed at the house, created Lord Compton, Earl of Northampton.  The ceiling of the royal bedroom is decorated with the monograms of all the monarchs who have slept here.

An anecdote from the time of the Civil War is that the Cromwellian commander of the house took such a liking to the gilded bed of state, slept in by so many monarchs, that he  sequestered it for himself. After the restoration of the monarchy, the 3rd Earl recovered the bed, and it too was restored to its rightful place. Later, when the family fell upon hard times in 1744, this historic bed was sold for £10 and has never since been traced.

Civil War 

Spencer, 2nd Earl of Northampton, a godson of Elizabeth I, was a close friend of Charles I, and the Comptons had strong Royalist ties during the civil war. At the battle of Edgehill six miles from the house, Spencer and three of his sons fought for the King; the three sons were all knighted for their valour on the battlefield.

The 2nd Earl was killed at the Battle of Hopton Heath in 1643 fighting for his cause, and in the same battle his son and successor, James 3rd Earl of Northampton, was wounded, leaving the family vulnerable. On 12 June 1644, Compton Wynyates was besieged by the Cromwellians, and it fell two days later. The Parliamentarians were recorded as having taken 120 prisoners, £5000 (equivalent to £720,000 in 2008), 60 horses, 400 sheep, 160 head of cattle, 18 loads of plunder (this would have been the furnishings of the mansion), and six earthen pots of coins recovered from the moat.  The house and the adjacent church still bear the scars of the cannon today.

There is a legend that the widow of the 2nd Earl remained hidden in the attics of the vast house tending to Royalist wounded, undetected by the Cromwellians, until their escape was possible. As the house is a warren of small staircases, passages, and almost concealed rooms – one tower room, the Priest's Room, has three staircases hidden behind its panelling – this story is possible.

During the night of 29 January 1645, the Comptons made an abortive attempt to recapture their home, but were repelled after four hours fighting. The Compton family fled into exile abroad and did not return until the restoration of the monarchy.

Neglect 

Following the restoration of the monarchy, the Comptons too were restored to their estates. As Compton Wynyates was now the minor family house, it tended to be the country home of the heir. Minor alterations were made but usually in sympathy to its Tudor origins.  The 5th Earl of Northampton c. 1730 added a wing between two towers on the east side of the house in the classical style, which was not in keeping at all.  By this time though, the family fortunes were running low and, as a result, Compton Wynyates began to suffer neglect.  In 1768 the Comptons found themselves in such penury that the entire contents of the house were sold, never to be recovered.  The then Lord Northampton, living at Castle Ashby, ordered Compton Wynyates to be demolished. However the family's land-agent ignored the order and merely had the windows bricked up (to avoid the window tax). So the house remained largely forgotten.

Restoration 

In 1835, the 2nd Marquess of Northampton (the family had been elevated from Earls in 1812) visited Compton Wynyates for the first time and found the house in a ruinous state; he made some minor renovations to prevent complete dereliction. He also employed the architect Sir Digby Wyatt to gothicise the out-of-keeping east front and create a new staircase in the house.  This work was a success, and the east front harmonises with the earlier facades of the house.

It was the 4th Marquess who had the house fully restored and presented it to his son, the future 5th Marquess, on his marriage in 1884. The 5th Marquess and Marchioness were the first people to reside in the house since 1770.  It was this couple who laid out the topiary gardens and made the mansion the comfortable house it is today.

Wynates is the birthplace and burial place of Spencer Compton, 1st Earl of Wilmington, considered to be the second Prime Minister of the United Kingdom.

Today 
The house today remains essentially the mansion that Edmund Compton and his son William completed within a thirty-year period during the reigns of the first two Tudor monarchs.

The 6th Marquess of Northampton (1885–1978) cared greatly for the house and spent a few months each year at Compton Wynyates. It was he who installed the electricity and water supplies; however, his principal home always remained Castle Ashby.  For a short time the panelled rooms of Compton Wynyates were open to the public: the chapel overlooked by the chapel drawing room, the King's bedroom, the heavily panelled drawing and dining rooms with their moulded plaster ceilings, and works of art, such as the crucifixion by Matteo Balducci, were on limited public display.

On the succession of Spencer, 7th Marquess of Northampton, it was decided that in order for the family to survive the 20th century, Castle Ashby would have to be heavily commercialised.  This was achieved and the Marquess and his family returned to make Compton Wynyates their sole country house. However, in the 21st century Castle Ashby was closed to the public (except for occasional weddings), and both houses are now lived in by the family once again.

In 1914, Compton Wynyates served as the inspiration, when the firm of noted American architect John Russell Pope designed Branch House in Richmond, Virginia, for wealthy financier John Kerr Branch (1865–1930) and his wife.

A dead-end public footpath runs from the village of Upper Tysoe about a mile away, ending at a tall locked gate a few yards short of the estate church, where the walker is instructed to return the way they came.  There is no access through to the public road a short distance further on.

Cultural references 
Compton Wynyates has occasionally been used as a filming location, including: The Black Tent (1955); Carry On Camping (1969), (Coincidentally these establishing shots are said to have come from the earlier Black Tent footage); Candleshoe (1977); Death on the Nile (1978); the 1980s television show Silver Spoons; An Instance of the Fingerpost (1998); The Mirror Crack'd (1980); a 1995 episode of Keeping Up Appearances and the television series The Tudors. The house was the inspiration for Croft Manor in the Tomb Raider series. The Cinema Museum in London holds film of the house from 1938 (Ref HM00083).

See also

 Marquess of Northampton

Notes

References

   A History of the County of Warwick, Volume 5 (1949) pp 60–67 from British History Online
Compton Wynyates – An anonymously written guide book. Published by the Marquess of Northampton c. 1968, during the short period that the house was open to the public.

External links

Colour photograph of Compton Wynyates
Details of Castle Ashby

Country houses in Warwickshire
Grade I listed buildings in Warwickshire
Grade I listed houses
Compton family
Prime ministerial homes in the United Kingdom
Brick Gothic
Gothic architecture in England
Tudor architecture
Stratford-on-Avon District